Henry Hampton (1862 – 11 February 1929) was an English sculptor, creator of public memorials and artist who was active between 1888 and 1927.

Life
Hampton was born at Hoddesdon, Hertfordshire, and died in Great Bardfield, Essex in 1929. After education at Bishop's Stortford College, he studied art at the Cardiff School of Art, the Lambeth, the Westminster, the Slade and then the Académies Julien and Colarossi in Paris. His legacy was a collection of public memorials across the United Kingdom and New Zealand.

Works

The Queen Victoria Monument in Lancaster, displays a sculpture of the queen guarded by four monumental lions, beneath them are four allegories to freedom, wisdom, truth and justice complete with a generous collection of putti; and four bas-relief friezes of fifty-three eminent Victorians, two of whom were women. 
 Queen Victoria Monument, Dalton Square, Lancaster, England.
 Ashton Memorial, Williamson Park, Lancaster, England
 Statue of the Duke of Devonshire, Whitehall, London
 Queen Victoria Memorial Statue (1905), Queens Gardens, Dunedin, New Zealand.
 Henry Austin Bruce, Lord Aberdare (1899), New Promenade, Aberystwyth, Wales
 Henry Austin Bruce, Lord Aberdare (1899), Alexandra Gardens, Cardiff, Wales

References

Sources

External links

1862 births
1929 deaths
19th-century British sculptors
British male sculptors
20th-century British sculptors
People from Hoddesdon
People educated at Bishop's Stortford College
Alumni of Cardiff School of Art and Design
Alumni of the Slade School of Fine Art
Académie Julian alumni
Académie Colarossi alumni
19th-century British male artists
20th-century British male artists